Theodora (Theodōra) is a feminine given name, the feminine version of Theodore, from the Greek  theos 'god' +  doron 'gift'. The name Dorothy (Greek: , Dōrothea) contains the same word elements in reverse order. It was the name of several saints and queens, including Theodora, a 6th-century Byzantine empress honored as a saint in the early Christian Church. Teodora, a variant, is among the top 10 most popular names for girls born in Serbia between 2003-2005.

Theodora, the Wicked Witch of the West (played by Mila Kunis) 2013 Disney fantasy adventure film, Oz: The Great and Powerful (2013).

Feminine variants
Dievodora (Lithuanian)
Bohdana (Ukrainian)
Dora (English, Spanish, Bulgarian)
Théodore (French)
Feodora, Fedora - Феодора, Федора (Russian)
Tea, Teja (Finnish), German, Scandinavian, Slovenian, Croatian
Teddi, Teddie, Teddy (English)
Teodóra (Hungarian)
Teodora, Theodhora, Dhora (Albanian)
Teodora/Теодора (Bulgarian, Macedonian, Italian, Polish, Portuguese, Romanian, Spanish, Swedish, Serbian, Bulgarian, Macedonian)
Teodora (Polish)
Thea (English, German, Scandinavian)
Theda (German)
 Todora/Todorka (Bulgarian, Macedonian)
 (Greek)
Tidora (Aramaic/Syriac)
Tedora (in Eritrea)

See also
 Theodora (disambiguation) - list of persons 
 Teodora - list of persons
Theodosia (disambiguation) - list of persons

Notes

Greek feminine given names
Theophoric names
Given names of Greek language origin